The 2015 Conference USA men's basketball tournament was the post-season men's basketball tournament for Conference USA, held March 11–14, 2015, in Birmingham, Alabama, at Legacy Arena.  On January 21, 2015, Southern Miss self-imposed a postseason ban due to recruiting violations. Despite having 14 members, only 12, excluding Southern Miss, made the tournament

Seeds

Schedule

Bracket

Game statistics

First round

Quarterfinals

Semifinals

Championship

See also
2015 Conference USA women's basketball tournament

References

Conference USA men's basketball tournament
Tournament
Conference USA men's basketball tournament
Conference USA men's basketball tournament